The 1997 European Women Basketball Championship, commonly called EuroBasket Women 1997, was the 26th regional championship held by FIBA Europe. The competition was held in Hungary and took place from 6 June to 15 June 1997.  won the gold medal and  the silver medal while  won the bronze.

Qualification

First stage

Group A

Group B

Group C

Second stage

Group A

Group B

Group C

Squads

First stage

Group A

Group B

Final stages

Placement stages

Final standings

External links
 FIBA Europe profile
 Todor66 profile

 
1997
1997 in Hungarian women's sport
International women's basketball competitions hosted by Hungary
June 1997 sports events in Europe
Euro